The Clara River is a river located in the Gulf Country of northwest Queensland, Australia.

From source to mouth, the Clara River is joined by the Borer River, Snowy Creek and Yarraman Creek, and descends  over its  course.

The headwaters in the Gregory Range are made up of ephemeral water courses and stony ridges composed of sandstone and conglomerate. The vegetation in the area is open forest which changes to savannah and grasslands of the open floodplains. The river and stream banks support riparian vegetation dominated by Red River Gum and Coolabah trees.

See also

References

Rivers of Queensland
North West Queensland